Rajavolu is a village in Guntur district of the Indian state of Andhra Pradesh. It is the located in Cherukupalle mandal of Tenali revenue division. PWS water scheme provides water to the residents.

Geography 
Rajavolu is situated to the east of the mandal headquarters, Arumbaka,

Demographics 
The village is home to 3,755 people with 1,161 households. The population consists of 6% schedule castes and 1% schedule tribes. It has healthy sex ratio of 1016 females per 1000 male in the village. The population of this village increased by 0.8% between 2001-11.

Government and politics 
Rajavolu gram panchayat is the local self-government of the village. It is divided into wards and each ward is represented by a ward member.

Education 

As per the school information report for the academic year 2018–19, the village has a total of 4 schools. These schools include 2 Zilla/Mandal Parishad and 2 private schools.

See also 
List of villages in Guntur district

References 

Villages in Guntur district